Diana Francis (born 1944 in Lancashire) is a British peace activist, Quaker, and author.

She is a graduate of the University of Oxford, and has a Ph.D. from the University of Bath, earned in 1998 with the thesis Respect in cross-cultural conflict resolution training. She is a former president of the International Fellowship of Reconciliation and Chair of the Committee for Conflict Transformation Support, and was the 2015 Swarthmore Lecturer.

Books
Francis is the author of:
People, Peace and Power: Conflict transformation in action, London, Pluto Press, 2002  (paperback)  (hardback)
Rethinking War and Peace, London and Ann Arbor, MI, Pluto Press, Pluto Press, 2004  (paperback)  (hardback)
From Pacification to Peacebuilding: A Call to Global Transformation London and Ann Arbor, MI, Pluto Press (20 Mar 2010)  (hardback).
Faith, Power and Peace: The 2015 Swarthmore Lecture, Quaker Books, 2015.

See also
 List of peace activists

References

External links
Home page
The 2015 Swarthmore Lecture on YouTube

1944 births
Alumni of the University of Oxford
Alumni of the University of Bath
British Quakers
Living people
Nonviolence advocates
Peace and conflict scholars